The 2021 Slippery Rock football team represented Slippery Rock University of Pennsylvania in the 2021 NCAA Division II football season. A member of the Pennsylvania State Athletic Conference they competed in the conference's West Division. The conference did not play football last fall due to the global COVID-19 pandemic. The team was coached by Shawn Lutz in his sixth season with the school.

Schedule

Rankings

References

Slippery Rock
Slippery Rock football seasons
Slippery Rock football